Harrisia aboriginum, the west-coast prickly apple or prickly applecactus, is a species of columnar cactus endemic to peninsular Florida, on the Gulf Coast of the counties of Lee, Sarasota County, and Charlotte. Only 12 occurrences are known, and the species is threatened by horticultural collection, shading from fire suppression, competition from invasive flora, and most of all habitat destruction. It is a federally listed endangered species of the United States.

Description
The west coast prickly apple is characterized by its slender columnar stems that sprawl out from a single base. These plants can reach up to 20 feet in height though sometimes the stems recline with age. It has scented white flowers up to 5 inches long, and a round fruit that shifts from yellow to red through development, somewhat resembling the appearance of an apple. Each fruit is packed full of hundreds of black seeds.

Habitat
The plant's natural habitat is usually coastal hammock strands. Thriving best in partial shade, these cacti are often found around larger trees including Live Oaks, Sabal palmetto or Wild Lime. Coastal hammocks of this kind have become uncommon in many coastal areas of central and south Florida due to clearing for development. This rapid overdevelopment is the main factor in the decline of the Prickly Apple population.

Threats
While once spread through much of southern Florida and the keys, the remaining populations of the cactus can now be found in Sarasota and Lee counties in less than a dozen known locations. Currently, the Marie Selby Botanical Gardens are working closely with the US Fish & Wildlife Service to try and save it from extinction by cultivating individual cacti to be re-established in their former habitat.

References

aboriginum
Cacti of the United States
Endemic flora of Florida
Plants described in 1920
Critically endangered flora of the United States